Malouetia quadricasarum,  synonym Malouetia isthmica, is a species of plant in the family Apocynaceae. It is native to Panama, Colombia and Peru. Under the synonym M. isthmica, it was assessed as "vulnerable" in the 1998 IUCN Red List. It is threatened by habitat loss.

References

quadricasarum
Flora of Colombia
Flora of Ecuador
Flora of Panama
Vulnerable plants
Taxonomy articles created by Polbot